The episodes of the Japanese anime series  are based on the last twenty-one volumes of the Inuyasha manga series by Rumiko Takahashi, continuing where the first adaptation left off. The series follows the half dog-demon, half human named Inuyasha, the fifteen-year-old junior high school student Kagome Higurashi and their close companions Miroku, Sango, Shippo and Kirara as they search for the last fragments of the Sacred Jewel of Four Souls and approach their final battle with Naraku. Viz Media licensed the series as InuYasha: The Final Act. The original staff and cast from the first Inuyasha anime adaptation were brought back together for the new series. The series premiered on Yomiuri TV on October 3, 2009, where it ran for twenty-six episodes, concluding on March 29, 2010. It is the first series to be produced and broadcast in 16:9 widescreen.

Viz Media licensed the new adaptation before it premiered and aired its English subtitled version online through Hulu, releasing episodes within a day of their original Japanese air dates. As of April 14, 2013, the entire series remains available for free on Hulu in the United States. As of episode 14, the English episode aired first. Animax Asia aired the series with their own English subtitles, on its television stations and its online video service.  As of September 23, 2022, the series has not been made available for streaming online in Canada.

Voice actress Kelly Sheridan was the first to announce through her Facebook fan page on May 11, 2010, that work on the English dub for The Final Act had begun. However, many of the cast were laid off: Moneca Stori was replaced from her role of Kagome Higurashi by Kira Tozer, David Kaye was replaced as Sesshomaru by Michael Daingerfield, Pam Hyatt was replaced as Kaede by Linda Darlow, and Danny McKinnon was replaced as Kohaku by Aidan Drummond. Kirby Morrow, the voice of Miroku, said on Voiceprint with Trevor Devall and guests that Michael Daingerfield was able to mimic David Kaye near perfectly. On December 17, 2010, Paul Dobson announced on a podcast episode of Voiceprint with Trevor Devall and guests that he would be going back to the Ocean Productions studio for his final recording session of Inuyasha: The Final Act on December 23, 2010. Viz Media released Inuyasha: The Final Act set 1 on Blu-ray and DVD on November 20, 2012, and set 2 was released February 12, 2013. 

The English dub, Inuyasha: The Final Act, began broadcasting in the United States on Viz Media's online network, Neon Alley, on October 2, 2012. On October 24, 2014, Adult Swim announced that Inuyasha: The Final Act would air on the Toonami programming block beginning Saturday, November 15, 2014. Previously, on March 1, 2014, Adult Swim had announced they had lost the broadcast rights to the original Inuyasha series.

Four pieces of theme music were used, one opening and three endings. "Kimi ga Inai Mirai" by Do As Infinity was the opening theme song for the series, used throughout the series. "With You" by AAA was the first ending from episode one to nine. The second ending was "Diamond" by Alan from episode ten to seventeen.

Episode list

References

2009 Japanese television seasons
2010 Japanese television seasons
Final Act, The